Durgapur Paschim Assembly constituency is an assembly constituency in Paschim Bardhaman district in the Indian state of West Bengal.

Overview
As per orders of the Delimitation Commission, No. 277 Durgapur Paschim assembly constituency covers ward nos. 11 – 22 and 29 – 43 of Durgapur municipal corporation.

As per orders of Delimitation Commission Durgapur Paschim Assembly constituency is part of No. 39 Bardhaman-Durgapur (Lok Sabha constituency).

Members of Legislative Assembly

Election results

2021

2016

2011 
Apurba Mukherjee emerged victorious by defeating his nearest rival Biprendu Kumar Chakraborty

.# Change for CPI(M) calculated on the basis of its vote percentage in 2006 in Durgapur I constituency. Trinamool Congress did not contest the seat in 2006.

1977–2010
In the by-election, caused by the death of sitting MLA, Mrinal Banerjee, held in July 2010, Archana Bhattacharya of CPI(M) defeated Bansi Badan Karmakar of Congress. Contests in most years were multi cornered but only winners and runners are being mentioned. Mrinal Banerjee of CPI (M) won the Durgapur I seat in 2006, 2001, and 1996 defeating Congress candidates Banshi Badan Karmakar, Chandra Sekhar Banerjee and Mrigendranath Pal respectively. Dilip Mazumdar of CPI (M) won the seat in 1991, 1987, 1982 and 1977.

1962–1972
Ananda Gopal Mukhopadhyay of Congress won the Durgapur seat in 1972.  Dilip Mazumdar of CPI (M) won the seat in 1971, 1969 and 1967.  Ananda Gopal Mukhopadhyay of INC won the seat in 1962.

References

Politics of Paschim Bardhaman district
Assembly constituencies of West Bengal
Durgapur, West Bengal